Gary Felix (born 31 October 1957) is an English footballer, who played as a midfielder in the Football League for Chester.

References

Chester City F.C. players
Association football midfielders
English Football League players
Footballers from Manchester
Living people
1957 births
English footballers